Narimanbekov is a surname. Notable people with the surname include:

Togrul Narimanbekov (1930–2013), Azerbaijani artist
Vidadi Narimanbekov (1926–2001), Azerbaijani artist